Mohammed Rahif Hakmi is the founder and chairman of Armada Group, a UAE-based conglomerate.

Biography
Mohammed Rahif Hakmi is the founder and chairman of Armada Group and has been licensed by Dubai Land Department (RERA - Real Estate Regulatory Agency) as Developer back in 2008. Hakmi holds a degree in Civil Engineering, M.Phil. and a PhD in Structural Engineering from the University of Salford, United Kingdom.

In 1989 he was awarded a Ph.D for his research into the Local Buckling of Sandwich Panels from the University of Salford in Manchester, England. He was subsequently had been employed by the University of Salford where he conducted a series of research into numerical and experimental behaviour of materials, fire and blast  of Composite materials. Hakmi developed a design theory, one of his formula has been recommended by the CIB Working Commission W056 Sandwich Panels, ECCS/CIB Joint Committee to be used in codes of practice and has been adopted as design formula by the European recommendations for sandwich panels (CIB, 2000). He was also involved in the Marine-tech North West programme on cost-effective use of fibre reinforced composites offshore.

In 2008, he was appointed as the chairman of the Board of Honor of Al-Karamah SC Football Club in  recognition of his support to the club.

Hakmi founded Armada in early 2000. He is its chairman. Under Hakmi the company has engaged in property development and other sectors, including hospitality and leisure, information technology and health care. Armada has developed some of Dubai's most notable landmarks, such as Armada Towers, The company has ongoing projects in Europe, Turkey and the Middle East.

Awards
 Science and Engineering Research Council Award, Overseas Research Scholarship (ORS) - United Kingdom.
 Institution of Structural Engineers Jubilee Award - United Kingdom.

See also
 Armada Group
 Al-Karamah SC
 Real Estate Regulatory Agency
 Armada Towers
 Sandwich plate system
 Metal faced insulating sandwich panels

References

External links
 Official website

1963 births
Businesspeople from Dubai
Living people
People associated with the University of Salford
People from Homs